is a city located in Yamaguchi Prefecture, Japan. As of September 30, 2016, the city has an estimated population of 117,387 and a population density of 622.44 people per km2. The total area is 188.59 km2.

History
Hōfu (防府) means "the capital (国府) of Suō Province (周防国)". The eastern part of Yamaguchi Prefecture was formerly called Suō Province.

The city was founded on August 25, 1936. The city's change over the past fifty years is shown in the animated film Mai Mai Miracle, with its story taking place in the year of 1955 (with flashbacks going 1,000 years further back).

Mazda maintains a large automobile factory in Hōfu.

Geography

Climate
Hōfu has a humid subtropical climate (Köppen climate classification Cfa) with hot summers and cool winters. Precipitation is significant throughout the year, but is much higher in summer than in winter.

Demographics
Per Japanese census data, the population of Hōfu in 2020 is 113,979 people. Hōfu has been conducting censuses since 1920.

Education
Yamaguchi Junior College (private junior college)

Main sightseeing spots
 Hōfu Tenman-gū

Sports
Hofu Keirin venue

Sister Cities
  Akitakata, Hiroshima,  Japan since July 16, 1971
  Chuncheon, Gangwon-do,  South Korea since October 29, 1991
  Monroe,  Michigan, United States, since May 29, 1993

Notable people
Taneda Santōka

References

External links

 Hōfu City official website  - Google translation embedded
  
 Oidemase Hōfu website 
 

Cities in Yamaguchi Prefecture
Port settlements in Japan
Populated coastal places in Japan